Pindari Dam is a minor concrete faced rockfill embankment dam with an ungated uncontrolled rock cut with concrete sill spillway across the Severn River located upstream of the town of Ashford, in the North West Slopes region of New South Wales, Australia. The dam's purpose includes flood mitigation, hydro-power, irrigation, water supply and conservation. The impounded reservoir is called Lake Pindari.

Location and features
The dam was built by Citra Australia Limited under contract to the New South Wales Water Department of Land and Water Conservation.

The ungated uncontrolled rock cut with concrete sill spillway is capable of discharging . An upgrade of facilities in 1995 involved doubling the height of the wall from its original  and increasing capacity to its current levels.

Pindari Dam is operated in conjunction with Queensland's Glenlyon Dam, located on the Dumaresq River, to supply NSW water users in the Border Rivers valley.

The name of the dam originates from the Aboriginal words meaning "high rock" and is the name of an early pastoral run which adjoined the reservoir.

Power generation
Constructed by a consortium including Transfield and GE Energy, the facility is owned and operated by Meridian Energy Australia Pty Limited. The hydro project comprises two horizontal Francis turbines rated at  each and made in Norway, a single generator designed by GE Canada and a transformer manufactured in Australia. The plant is fully automated and remote controlled.

Recreation
Recreation activities on Lake Pindari include bushwalking, picnicking, sailing, swimming, fishing and waterskiing. The foreshore park is a popular local picnic site and camping area on a crown reserve, managed by Inverell Shire Council. There is a lookout on the main dam wall. Recreation facilities include a boat ramp, barbecues, bush shelter sheds and tables and toilets.

See also

 Border Rivers
 Glenlyon Dam
 Irrigation in Australia
 List of dams and reservoirs in New South Wales

References

External links
 

Dams completed in 1969
Energy infrastructure completed in 2001
North West Slopes
Dams in New South Wales
Murray-Darling basin
Hydroelectric power stations in New South Wales
Embankment dams
Inverell Shire